"Suojatiellä" (in English, "On the Pedestrian Crossing") is a song by Finnish recording artist Maija Vilkkumaa, released by Warner Music Finland for airplay on 13 June 2008, and digitally on 16 June, as the first single from her fifth studio album Superpallo. Written by Vilkkumaa, the song spent two weeks on the Finnish Singles Chart, peaking at number 10 on the debut week.

Track listing and formats
Digital download

References

2008 singles
Maija Vilkkumaa songs
Songs written by Maija Vilkkumaa
2008 songs
Warner Music Group singles